Park Noh-sik (February 4, 1930 – April 3, 1995) was a South Korean actor. Park was born in Suncheon, South Jeolla province, Korea in 1930. Park graduated from Suncheon School of Education. Park debuted as an actor in 1956 by starring in Gyeoktoe (격퇴) directed by Lee Gang-cheon. Park had starred in over 900 films and established his career as an action film star. In the 1970s, Park started directing.

Filmography
*Note; the whole list is referenced.

Director

Awards
 1963, the 2nd Grand Bell Awards : Best Supporting Actor for (진시황제와 만리장성)
 1965, the 3rd Blue Dragon Film Awards : Best Supporting Actor for (용사는 살아 있다)
 1965, the 4th Grand Bell Awards : Best Supporting Actor for (청일전쟁과 여걸 민비)
 1967, the 6th Grand Bell Awards : Best Actor for (고발)
 1968, the 7th Grand Bell Awards : Best Supporting Actor for (카인의 후예)
 1969, the 6th Blue Dragon Film Awards : Best Supporting Actor for (카인의 후예)
 1970, the 7th Blue Dragon Film Awards : Best Actor for (돌아온 팔도사나이)
 1972, the 9th Blue Dragon Film Awards : Best Actor for (소장수)
 1972, the 9th Blue Dragon Film Awards : Favorite Actor
 1973, the 10th Blue Dragon Film Awards : Favorite Actor

References

External links

1930 births
1995 deaths
People from Suncheon
20th-century South Korean male actors
South Korean male film actors
South Korean male television actors